is a passenger railway station in located in the town of   Yosano, Kyoto Prefecture, Japan, operated by the private railway company Willer Trains (Kyoto Tango Railway).

Lines
Yosano Station is a station of the Miyazu Line, and is located 35.7 kilometers from the terminus of the line at Nishi-Maizuru Station.

Station layout
The station has one ground-level side platform and one ground-level island platform connected to the station building by a level crossing. The station is staffed. The station building is characterized by a roof shaped like a kimono collar, which is associated with the production area of Tango chirimen, a type crepe fabric which is a local speciality.

Platforms

Adjacent stations

History
On March 31, 1990 it was renamed  , and renamed again to its present name on March 31, 2015.<

Passenger statistics
In fiscal 2019, the station was used by an average of 222 passengers daily.

Surrounding area
 Nodagawa Forest Park, Kyoto Prefecture Nodagawa Youth Center
Kyoto Prefectural Kaetsuya High School

See also
List of railway stations in Japan

References

External links

Official home page 

Railway stations in Kyoto Prefecture
Railway stations in Japan opened in 1925
Yosano, Kyoto